Dogtown, also known as Cagle's Crossroads, Dog Town, and Ruhama, is an unincorporated community in DeKalb County, Alabama, United States.

History
First called Cagle's Crossroads after a local family, the community was then called Dogtown due to the large number of hunters and their dogs that frequented the area. It is also referred to as Ruhama, in reference to a local Baptist church that was organized in 1900.

References

Unincorporated communities in DeKalb County, Alabama
Unincorporated communities in Alabama